This is a list of members of the Australian House of Representatives from 1990 to 1993, as elected at the 1990 federal election.

 Menzies Liberal MP Neil Brown resigned in early 1991. Liberal candidate Kevin Andrews won the resulting by-election.
 Wills Labor MP and outgoing Prime Minister Bob Hawke resigned in early 1992. Independent candidate Phil Cleary won the resulting by-election, only to have the result overturned by the Court of Disputed Returns in the landmark case Sykes v Cleary on the grounds that Cleary, a school teacher, was in the employ of the government at the time. Another by-election was not held due to the proximity of the 1993 election, where Cleary, having resigned his teaching position, again won the seat.
 Capricornia Labor MP Keith Wright was charged with sex offences in late 1992. He subsequently lost preselection to recontest his seat at the 1993 federal election, and was expelled from the party on 20 February 1993 after nominating to recontest his seat as an independent.

References

Members of Australian parliaments by term
20th-century Australian politicians